Saint Antoninus may refer to:
Antoninus of Rome (died 186), martyr
Antoninus of Pamiers (first, second, fourth, or fifth century), missionary and martyr, called the "Apostle of the Rouergue"
Antoninus of Syria  (died 303), martyr
Antoninus of Piacenza (died 303), patron saint of Piacenza
Antoninus Fontana (Antonino Fontana), archbishop of Milan (died 661)
Antoninus of Florence (1389–1459)
Antoninus of Sorrento (died 830 AD)